Coney Island is an island on the New River at Hinton in Summers County, West Virginia. Coney Island is located directly downstream from Bushes Island. Beech Run empties into the New River to the island's west.

See also 
List of islands of West Virginia

River islands of West Virginia
Landforms of Summers County, West Virginia